"masterpiece" is the seventh single released by the J-pop singer, Mami Kawada, and was released on February 4, 2009. The title track was used as the second opening theme for the anime series A Certain Magical Index which is her third tie-in with the anime series. This is also Kawada's first single to be produced by a female composer/arranger of I've Sound, which is Maiko Iuchi.

The coupling song jellyfish was used as an insert song on the twenty-third episode of A Certain Magical Index making this Kawada's 4th tie-in with the said anime series.

The single will come in a limited CD+DVD edition (GNCV-0013) and a regular edition (GNCV-0014). The DVD will contain the Promotional Video for masterpiece.

Track listing
masterpiece—4:37
Lyrics: Mami Kawada
Composition/Arrangement: Maiko Iuchi
jellyfish—4:26
Lyrics: Mami Kawada
Composition: Tomoyuki Nakazawa
Arrangement: Tomoyuki Nakazawa, Takeshi Ozaki
masterpiece (instrumental) -- 4:37
jellyfish (instrumental) -- 4:24

Reception
It peak ranked 12th on the weekly Oricon singles chart and remained on the chart for nine weeks.

References

A Certain Magical Index music
2009 singles
2009 songs
Mami Kawada songs
Anime songs
Songs with lyrics by Mami Kawada
Song recordings produced by I've Sound